Christos Tsoutsouvis (1953 – 15 May 1985, Athens) was a Greek far-left militant, or "urban guerilla" fighter. 

Tsoutsouvis was killed in 1985 during an exchange of fire with police officers.

Biography 
Christos Tsoutsouvis was born in 1953. During studies in Graz in Austria Tsoutsouvis became a member of anti-dictatorial movement PAK. After the fall of the dictatorship he was a represantive of the PASOK political party in the elections of 1974. Afterwards he joined far-left urban guerrilla organization Revolutionary People's Struggle (ELA) and participated in many armed actions. Tsoutsouvis  left ELA in 1980 and founded own group the Anti-State Struggle.  The Anti-State Struggle was to claim responsibility for the killing of prosecutor Giorgos Theofanopoulos on 1 April 1985. 

Greek Minister of Public Order Alexandros Floros stated that the Ministry had evidence that Tsoutsouvis was linked to the Revolutionary Organization 17 November, and Tsoutsouvis' apartment was found to contain an armory of weapons along with "detonators, batteries and wiring for assembling explosive devices, a duplicating machine, equipment for faking license plates and burglary tools."  He asserted that Tsoutsouvis and his organization was linked to the murder of District Attorney George Theofanopoulos, shot and killed outside his home in April 1985.

On 15 May 1985 in Gyzi, near central Athens, three police officers investigating recent political murders detected a stolen motorcycle near Tsoutsouvis' apartment building. As they were investigating, Tsoutsouvis and an accomplice opened fire.  Three police officers were killed in the exchange. Tsoutsouvis was also killed and his accomplice escaped.

Legacy

Christos Tsoutsouvis Revolutionary Organization 
The left-wing, German terrorist organization, Christos Tsoutsouvis Revolutionary Organization, is named in his honour.  Also translates as, Fighting Unit Christos Tsoutsouvis, it is thought to be connected with the Red Army Faction.  In 1986 the group bombed the Office for the Protection of  the Constitution, West Germany's counterintelligence agency, in Cologne, Germany.  In August 1987 the group set off bombs outside a government ministry and a police station in Athens.

In leftist and anarchist movement 
The slogans "Ένας, τρεις, Χρήστος Τσουτσουβής" (meaning "One, three, Christos Tsoutsouvis") and "Μπάτσοι το Γκύζη κάτι σας θυμίζει" ("Cops, Gyzi reminds you of something") are often chanted by far-left and anarchist demonstrators in memory of the shootout that resulted in his death and the death of three of the police officers that confronted him.

References  

1953 births
1985 deaths
Greek communists
Communist terrorism
Terrorism in Greece
Far-left politics
Resistance to the Greek junta
Members of the Panhellenic Liberation Movement
Deaths by firearm in Greece

Greek anarchists
People from Tenea